Defective Epitaph is a 2007 album by the American one-man black metal act Xasthur. This is the first recording on which Malefic played acoustic drums, although some tracks still make use of a drum machine. Like previous Xasthur albums, the lyrics were not released to the public ("The lyrics are unavailable upon request" inside the CD box). It was described by one reviewer as Xasthur's most accessible release to date. The Japanese edition released on Daymare Recordings features a bonus disc containing 5 unreleased tracks.

Track listing

Personnel
Malefic – vocals, all instruments

References

2007 albums
Xasthur albums
Hydra Head Records albums